Julodis viridipes is a species of beetle belonging to the Buprestidae family.

Description
The basic color is blue. Head, thorax and abdomen are covered with tufts of yellow hair. Legs are green (hence the Latin name viridipes of the species).

Distribution
This species can be found in South Africa and is associated with the woody shrub Didelta spinosa.

References

Buprestidae
Beetles described in 1835